Pederneiras is a municipality in the state of São Paulo in Brazil. The population is 47,111 (2020 est.) in an area of 729 km². The elevation is 475 m above sea level.

History 
Starting from 1842, small villages were established in the area of the Tietê River. In 1848 Manoel dos Santos Simões and his two sons, Manuel Leonel dos Santos and João Leonel dos Santos, established a farm in the parish of Botucatu. They named the farm Pederneiras after the large amount of flint stone in the area. In 1865, the settlement became part of the municipality of Lençóis Paulista. Four years later it became a parish with the name São Sebastião de Alegria. Coffee plantations led to growth of the settlement, and in 1891 it became a separate municipality. In 1895, the town's name was changed back into "Pederneiras".

Most of the residents from Pederneiras used to complain because they had to cross long distances to solve their Judicial matters in Lençóis Paulista only (another municipality located around 35 km distance), due to the Judicial district was settled there. Trying to soften the problem, they changed it from Lençóis Paulista to Jaú (a closer municipality located around 25 km distance) in 1895. Only in 1928 they set the own Judicial district in Pederneiras Town.

The birthday of the municipality is featured by the festival called Nations's Fair, where it is possible to find different kind of shows and different kind of dishes from different nationalities.

Politics in the city is clearly separated into two political party: PV and PSDB, the first represented by the Green colour and the other one represented by the Red colour.

Geography 
Location: Pederneiras municipality is exactly located in the geographic center of São Paulo state. It makes frontier with the following municipalities: Arealva and Bariri to the north; Boracéia, Itapuí and Jaú to the east; Lençóis Paulista and Macatuba to the south; Agudos and Bauru to the west.

Districts: It has three different districts: Guaianás (west); Vanglória (south); Santelmo (north).

Soil: The soil of this place is formed by the Bauru sandstone and by an excellent variety of productive massapé zones.

Vegetation: The quantity of reserves of the native vegetation is very little. There is the replanting of pine and eucalyptus. About 70% of the rural area soil is used for sugarcane plantation and pastures for the cattle.

Climate: Summer is hot and humid whereas winter is dry. Annual temperature goes from 16 °C (60 °F) to 34 °C (94 °F).

Demography 

Total population: 45.000Census IBGE 2010

 Urban: 38,592
 Rural: 2,905
 Men: 20,861
 Women: 20,636

Population density (people per km²): 56.92

Child mortality (children under the age of one): 15.51‰

Life expectancy (years): 71.41

Fertility rate: 2.51

Literacy rate: 89.90%

Human Development Index (HDI): 0.780

Hydrography 

 Tietê River
 Bauru river
 Veado streamlet
 Água Limpa streamlet
 Patos streamlet
 Pederneiras rivulet - in the urban area
 Monjolo rivulet - in the urban area

Highways/Roads 

 SP-225: Comandante João Ribeiro de Barros
 SP-261: César Augusto Sgavioli
 SP-261: Osni Mateus
 Another roads which connects the town with the districts.

Economy 
The economy of the town is diversified, most of the agriculture is based on sugarcane and the citriculture is expanding. Pederneiras is developing on metallurgical and mechanical industries, it started when Volvo industry settled in the town in 1974. After this, other medium and small companies started to settle in the town. An important industry is Pedertractor, which is responsible for the manufacturing of truck and tractor parts (Volvo, Caterpillar, Case) like: electric motors, rotors, stators. In May, 2006, the large Japanese Ajinomoto company had also settled, which is making use of the large quantity of sugarcane material available to produce enzymes to export.

References

External links

Anthem

Municipalities in São Paulo (state)